MV Cpl. Louis J. Hauge Jr. (AK-3000), (former MV Estelle Mærsk), was the lead ship of the  built in 1979. The ship is named after Corporal Louis J. Hauge Jr., an American Marine who was awarded the Medal of Honor during World War II.

Construction and commissioning 
The ship was built in 1979 at the Odense Staalskibsvaerft A/S, Lindø, Denmark. She was put into the service of Maersk Line as Estelle Mærsk.

In 1985, she was acquired and chartered by the Navy under a long-term contract as MV Cpl. Louis J. Hauge Jr. (AK-3000). The ship underwent conversion at the Bethlehem Steel at Sparrows Point, Maryland. She was assigned to Maritime Prepositioning Ship Squadron 3 and supported the US Marine Corps Expeditionary Brigade. On 1 May 1986, the ship was anchored in Subic Bay during Exercise Freedom Banner 1986.

On 16 August 1990, Cpl. Louis J. Hauge Jr. carried equipments that would later be used during Operation Desert Storm.

On 20 August 2008, she was part of the Southeast Asia Cooperation Against Terrorism (SEACAT) exercises. In 2009, the ship returned to Maersk Line as MV Abby G. Sealift Inc. later acquired the ship in 2010 and operated the ship with the same name until August of later that year, in which she was towed to Alang, India for scrap.

Awards 

 National Defense Service Medal

References

Cpl. Louis J. Hauge Jr.-class cargo ship
1979 ships
Ships built in Denmark
Gulf War ships of the United States
Merchant ships of the United States
Cargo ships of the United States Navy
Container ships of the United States Navy